No. 189 Squadron was a Royal Air Force squadron.

History

No. 189 Squadron was formed at RFC Ripon on 20 December 1917 as a night-flying training unit, moving shortly afterwards to Sutton's Farm to continue their work until the end of World War I. On 1 March 1919, the squadron was disbanded.

The squadron was re-formed as part of No. 5 Group RAF on 15 October 1944 at RAF Bardney near the village of Bardney in Lincolnshire.  They flew Lancaster bombers in raids over occupied Europe towards the end of World War II in 1944 and 1945.

The commanding officer was Wing Commander J. S. Shorthouse DFC.

After RAF Bardney, the squadron was based at RAF Fulbeck near the village of Fulbeck, returning to Bardney in April 1945 and then on to RAF Metheringham near Metheringham.

The unit was mixed, with many personnel from other parts of the Commonwealth including Australians, New Zealanders and Canadians.

No. 189 Squadron was among the 107 Lancasters and 12 Mosquitos of No 5 Group which attacked the oil refinery in Tonsberg in Southern Norway on 25 April 1945 in the last raid of the war flown by heavy bombers of RAF Bomber Command.

After the war the unit was involved in dropping food to the Dutch and repatriating POWs until it was disbanded on 20 November 1945.

Aircraft operated

 1917 - Avro 504K
 1917 - Royal Aircraft Factory BE2e
 1917 - Sopwith Pup
 1918 - Sopwith Camel
 1944 - Avro Lancaster I and III

Example of Operations

The following sortie details are taken from the operations record book for 189 sqdn.

See also
List of Royal Air Force aircraft squadrons

External links
 http://www.controltowers.co.uk/B/Bardney.htm
 http://airfieldarchaeology.fotopic.net/c937064.html
 http://raf-lincolnshire.info/fulbeck/fulbeck.htm
 http://www.raf.mod.uk/bombercommand/s67.html

Military units and formations established in 1917
189 Squadron
1917 establishments in the United Kingdom